Plateopsis is a monotypic moth genus of the family Crambidae described by William Warren in 1896. Its only species, Plateopsis vespertilio, described in the same article, is found in Meghalaya, India.

References

Spilomelinae
Taxa named by William Warren (entomologist)
Crambidae genera
Monotypic moth genera